Ian Moore is the eponymous debut album by Ian Moore and was released in 1993 (see 1993 in music).

Track listing
All songs by Ian Moore, except where noted.

"Nothing" - 5:16
"Revelation" - 4:34
"Satisfied" - 4:15
"Blue Sky" - 5:56
"Not in Vain" - 5:16 (Ian Moore, Chris White, Michael Villegas)
"Harlem" - 4:57
"How Does it Feel" - 5:02
"Deliver Me" - 6:16 (Ian Moore, Chris White)
"How Long" - 4:27 (Ian Moore, Michael Dan Ehmig)
"Please God" - 4:47
"Carry On" - 5:43

Personnel
Ian Moore - vocals, guitars
Chris White - bass
Bukka Allen - piano, organ, clavinet
Michael Villegas - drums
with:
Barry Beckett - keyboards, organ
Reese Wynans - B-3 organ on "Satisfied" and "Please God"
Justin Niebank - percussion
Donna McElroy, Justin Niebank, Kathy Burdick, Kelli Bruce, Kim Fleming, Yvonne Hodges - backing vocals

References

1993 debut albums
Albums produced by Barry Beckett
Capricorn Records albums
Ian Moore (musician) albums